Benjamin Neeve Peach  (6 September 1842 – 29 January 1926) was a British geologist.

Life
Peach was born at Gorran Haven in Cornwall on 6 September 1842 to Jemima Mabson and Charles William Peach, an amateur British naturalist and geologist. He was educated at the Royal School of Mines in London and then joined the Geological Survey in 1862 as a geologist, moving to the Scottish branch in 1867. He is best remembered for his work on the Northwest Highlands and Southern Uplands with his friend and colleague John Horne, where they resolved the long-running "Highlands Controversy" with their 1907 publication of The Geological Structure of the North-West Highlands of Scotland.

In 1881 he was elected a Fellow of the Royal Society of Edinburgh. His proposers were Archibald Geikie, Sir Charles Wyville Thomson, Peter Guthrie Tait and Robert Gray. He won the Society's Neill Prize for the period 1883–86. He served as the Society's Vice President from 1912 to 1917.

He was elected a Fellow of the Royal Society in 1892. The citation on his candidacy form read: "District Surveyor of the Geological Survey of Scotland. Past President of the Physical Society of Edinburgh. Recipient of the Wollaston Donation Fund of the Geological Society in 1887. For thirty years actively engaged on the Geological survey, during which time he has mapped many of the most complicated districts of Scotland. Has charge of the surveying of the NW Highlands, and has taken the leading part in unravelling the remarkable structural complications of that region. Author of various papers on palaeontological subjects: – 'On some New Crustaceans from the Lower Carboniferous Rocks of Eskale and Liddesdale' (Trans Roy Soc Edin, vol xxx, p. 73); 'On some new species of Fossil Scorpions from the Carboniferous Rocks of Scotland' (ibid, p 399); 'Further Researches among the Crustacea and Arachnida of the Carboniferous Rocks of the Scottish Border' (ibid, p 511); 'On some Fossil Myriapods from the Lower Old Red Sandstone of Forfarshire (Proc Roy Phys Soc Edin, vol vii, p 179). Joint author with Mr J Horne of many papers on stratigraphical and physical geology, including : – 'The Glaciation of the Shetland Isles' (Quart Journ Geol Soc, vol xxxv, p 778); 'The Glaciation of the Orkney Islands' (ibid, vol xxxvi, p 648); 'The Old Red Sandstone of Shetland' (Proc Roy Phys Soc Edin, vol v, p 30); 'The Glaciation of Caithness (ibid, vol vi, p 316); 'Report on the Geology of the North-West of Sutherland' (Nature, vol xxxi, p 31); 'The Old Red Sandstone Volcanic Rocks of Shetland' (Trans Roy Soc Edin, vol xxxii, p 539); 'Report on the Recent Work of the Geological Survey in the North-West Highlands of Scotland, based on the Field Maps of B N Peach, J Horne, W Gunn, C T Clough, L Hinxman, and H M Cadell' (Quart Journ Geol Soc, vol xliv, p. 378). "

In 1905 he succeeded Ramsay Heatley Traquair as President of the Geological Society of Glasgow. He was succeeded in time in 1908 by John Walter Gregory.

He was awarded the Wollaston Medal of the Geological Society in 1921.

A monument to the work of Peach and Horne was erected at Inchnadamph, close to the Moine Thrust where they did some of their best-known work. The inscription reads: "To Ben N Peach and John Horne who played the foremost part in unravelling the geological structure of the North West Highlands 1883–1897. An international tribute. Erected 1930.".

Peach was twice married. His first wife was Jeanie Bannatyne (1846–1884) with whom he had four daughters and two sons. He then married Margaret Anne MacEwen (1868–1921), with whom he had two sons. Two of his sons and two of his daughters survived him. His later home was at 72 Grange Loan in Edinburgh.

He died of a cerebral thrombosis at his niece's house at 33 Comiston Drive on 29 January 1926. He is buried in Morningside Cemetery, Edinburgh. The grave lies in the fenced western section, and is inaccessible without prior arrangement.

Notable persons working with Peach
Peach's survey team included several notable geologists including: Charles Barrois, William Savage Boulton, Charles Hawker Dinham, Thomas John Jehu, Aubrey Strahan, Sidney Hugh Reynolds and James Ernest Richey.

See also

Knockan Crag
Inchnadamph
North West Highlands Geopark
Geology of Scotland
Ordnance Gazetteer of Scotland: A Graphic and Accurate Description of Every Place in Scotland (Peach co-contributed its section on geology)

References

External links 
 Ben Peach archive

1842 births
1926 deaths
Geologists from Cornwall
Wollaston Medal winners
Fellows of the Royal Society
Fellows of the Royal Society of Edinburgh
Fellows of the Royal Geographical Society